Die Ärzte is the third album by German rock band Die Ärzte. "Geschwisterliebe", and with it the whole album, was put in German List of Media Harmful to Young People on 27 January 1987. 

In late 2020, a Reissue of the Album was released, which replaced "Geschwisterliebe" with the song "Frühjahrsputz", which uses the same instrumental but with different lyrics.

This was the first album recorded since Sahnie left the band. The bass guitar was played by their producer, Manne Praeker.

Track listing 
 "Wie am ersten Tag" [Like on the first day] – 3:41
 "Mysteryland" – 4:02
 "Sweet Sweet Gwendoline" – 2:50
 "Ist das alles?" [Is that all?] – 3:39
 "Geschwisterliebe" [Sibling love] – 4:11
 "Alleine in der Nacht" [Alone in the night] – 2:47
 "Jenseits von Eden" [Beyond Eden] – 4:00 (Drafi Deutscher cover)
 "Wir werden schön" [We become beautiful] – 4:01
 "Für immer" [Forever] – 3:46
 "Ich bin reich" [I am rich] – 4:22
 "Zum letzten Mal" [For the last time] – 4:24

Singles
1986: "Für immer"
1986: "Ist das alles?"

Personnel
Farin Urlaub – guitar, vocals
Bela Felsenheimer – drums, vocals
Manne Praeker – bass guitar

Charts

References

1986 albums
Die Ärzte albums
German-language albums